Luxair Flight 9642 was a scheduled international passenger flight from Berlin, Germany, to Luxembourg City, Luxembourg, operated by Luxembourg national airline Luxair. On 6 November 2002, the aircraft operating the flight, a Fokker 50 registered as LX-LGB, lost control and crashed onto a field during an attempted landing at the airport. Out of 22 passengers and crew members on board, only two people survived. The crash is the deadliest aviation disaster to occur in Luxembourg.

Luxembourg's Administration for Technical Investigations (AET) concluded that the crash was caused by pilot error. The crew decided to accept the approach clearance that had been given by the ATC even though they had not conducted enough preparation for the landing, leading the crew to conduct a series of improvised actions. Their actions led to the override of a certain safety features that would have prevented the propellers from entering the reverse angle, enabling the propellers to enter the reverse angle in flight and led to the lost control situation.

The result of the investigation highlighted the possible safety risk regarding the protection system against an accidental deployment of reverse angle in turboprops during mid-flight, prompting Fokker to issue a mandatory modification on the safety feature.

Aircraft 

The aircraft involved in the crash was a Fokker F50, manufactured in 1991 with a serial number of 20221. The aircraft was delivered to Luxair on the same year with a registration of LX-LGB. Equipped with PW125B engines and two Dowty propellers, it had accumulated a total of 24,068 flight cycles. According to Luxair, the aircraft had been maintained properly. The last service was conducted on 4 May. The maintenance logbook indicated that the last defect, an inoperative anti-skid system on the aircraft, had been rectified on 5 November, one day before the accident.

Accident 
Flight 9642 was a regularly scheduled international passenger flight from Berlin-Tempelhof Airport to Luxembourg Findel Airport. On 6 November, the aircraft was scheduled to take off from Tempelhof and would be piloted by Captain Claude Poeckes and his co-pilot First Officer John Arendt. It took off from Berlin at around 07:40 a.m local time with 19 passengers and 3 crew members on board.

While the aircraft was flying at its cruising altitude, at around 08:55 a.m, the pilots checked the Automatic Terminal Information Service (ATIS) for the weather information in Luxembourg. The visibility in the area had deteriorated due to the presence of heavy fog. With such low visibility, the crew realised that there would be delay for the landing. They either had to wait until the weather condition began to improve by entering the holding pattern or diverting their aircraft to the alternate airport.

Feeling impatient, the crew decided to continue their flight to Luxembourg as planned. After several minutes, the crew checked the ATIS information again, only to discover that the visibility had not improved. They then discussed on the possible strategies for a landing during bad weather condition but failed to reach conclusion on the matter. As no decision was taken, the approach briefing was not conducted.

While First Officer Arendt was giving an address to the passengers, Captain Poeckes tried to contact Luxair officials on whether the weather had improved as a departing Cargolux jet might have cleared some of the fog in the area. To his disappointment, the airport was still covered with heavy fog. Due to the constant foggy condition, the crew were told to enter the Diekrich VOR, Findel's holding pattern. Co-pilot Arendt then announced to the passengers that the flight would enter a holding pattern first and that they would wait until the weather began to improve.

The transmission caught them off guard. First Officer Arendt was initially confused by the transmission and asked Captain Poeckes:"Is that for us?", to which the captain responded with "yes". The crew accepted the instruction, but First Officer Arendt was still surprised by the transmission as he could be heard saying "What kind of shit is that?"

Approach
The crew still didn't understand the reasons for the descent that had been requested by the controller. Fearing that they had been asked to prepare for an approach, they repeatedly checked the RVR (Runway Visual Range) value with Luxair Dispatch, but the weather in Findel Airport was still below the minimum amount for the landing. They were initially feeling uncertain about whether the controller had sent such transmission for holding or for an approach.

Afterwards, the controller sent a message that cleared the crew's confusion. The controller specifically asked Flight 9642 to conduct an approach to Findel Airport. The crew were perplexed as the weather conditions had not met the minimum criteria for a landing. Meanwhile, The ATC didn't know about the required RVR information as the crew had not informed the ATC about the matter. Despite being confused, the crew accepted the controller's request anyway and started to fly their aircraft as per the controller's instructions. The crew now realized that they had been chosen as the first aircraft that would land at Findel, increasing their workload pressure. Following the transmission, the crew frantically prepared their aircraft for an approach.

During the approach to the beacon, Captain Poeckes told First Officer Arendt that they would conduct a missed approach if the weather was still below . After successfully capturing the airport's ILS, the crew checked on the RVR again, only to discover that the weather had deteriorated even further.

After rushing through the approach checklist, the aircraft finally reached ELU. They checked the RVR again and the report didn't indicate any improvements. Captain Poeckes then told First Officer Arendt that they would execute a missed approach, but the aircraft kept continuing to Findel. First Officer Arendt kept checking the approach checklist and then put the ground idle stop in the off position, as it was the last action that the crew were required to do on the checklist.

Captain Poeckes was not satisfied with the weather report and eventually called for a go-around at 09:04 local time. Just 10 seconds later, however, the ATC reported that the RVR had improved to 300 metres, the exact minimum amount for the landing of the Fokker 50. Immediately after this announcement, Captain Poeckes changed his mind and First Officer Arendt prepared the aircraft for landing.

Crash
As they had been levelling off for quite some time after passing point ELU, the aircraft was flying a bit higher than the glideslope. To reduce their altitude faster, Captain Poeckes stated that he would try to reduce the power lever to flight idle, claiming that by doing so the aircraft would quickly descend to the required altitude. However, First Officer Arendt voiced his concern and told Captain Poeckes that such action wouldn't be enough to slow down the aircraft.

First Officer Arendt reported to the ATC that they would continue the approach to Findel. Flight 9642 was eventually cleared to land and the crew extended the landing gear.

After extending the landing gear, the propeller speed began to increase, startling the crew due to the audible noise. The aircraft's speed and altitude then rapidly dropped. The crew realised that the reverse thrust had been deployed in mid-flight and tried to save the aircraft. In an attempt to regain lift, First Officer Arendt immediately retracted the flaps and Captain Poeckes moved the thrust lever fully forward. The aircraft, however, continued to plummet towards the ground.

As a last resort, the crew decided to shut down both engines. It didn't stop the aircraft's rapid descent. Faced with imminent crash, the crew tried to flare as much as possible to prevent a destructive impact.

The aircraft slammed onto terrain with its belly, crossing the Route Nationale 1 and scraped the road with its left wing. It then struck an embankment, inflicting major damage to the airframe. The aircraft bounced and both wheels and blades came off of the aircraft. The empennage and part of the right wing broke away. The aft fuselage detached and rested on its right side. The aircraft eventually came to a halt  further away. After coming to a stop, a fire began to erupt on the central portion of the crushed fuselage.

Immediate aftermath

Flight 9642 suddenly ceased all contact with Findel Airport. Its blip had disappeared from the radar screen, prompting the controller to call the crew multiple times to confirm their condition. As there was no response, the airport emergency services were alerted to a possible crash. A telephone call from a witness eventually confirmed that the aircraft had crashed near the airport. Meanwhile, at the crash site, taxi driver Guillaume Wainachter was the first to arrive. He attempted to save the passengers in the fuselage as survivors could be heard screaming loudly inside the wreckage. While trying to save the survivors, he heard a noise from the aircraft, and it immediately went up in flames in a matter of seconds.

It was immediately found that the aircraft had crashed in a field  to the north of runway centreline. The wreckage was located between the village of Niederanven and Roodt-Syr. Rescue services found several passengers had been ejected from the aircraft. One survivor had been ejected from the aircraft during the crash and was found outside. Three survivors were extricated alive from the fuselage and immediately rushed to the hospital, all of whom later succumbed to their injuries. Captain Poeckes was found trapped inside the cockpit, but he survived as the cockpit didn't catch fire. Rescuers had to cut a hole to evacuate him from the wreckage.

The fog was so thick that some nearby residents were unaware of the crash. Most of them claimed not to have seen or even heard anything when the crash occurred, and only realized that something had happened nearby when ambulances and emergency services arrived at the crash site.

Due to the crash, Findel Airport was closed for more than three hours. Several flights had to be diverted to Germany and Belgium.

Passengers and crew

Most of the passengers were business officials from Germany. Seventeen were found dead at the crash site with five survivors, three of whom died in the hospital. By nightfall, 18 bodies out of the 20 dead were found, while the other two remained missing. The bodies were thought to be buried under the smoldering fuselage. Rescue workers were using a crane to disentangle the charred remains. Amongst the passengers killed on the flight was artist Michel Majerus.

The Captain was 26-year-old Claude Poeckes, who had a total flying experience of 4,242 flight hours and 2,864 hours on type. The First Officer was 32-year-old John Arendt with a total flight hours of 1,156 and 443 hours on type.

Nationalities of passengers and crew

Response 
Following the crash, a hospital in Belgium was put on alert. A total of 300 police officers were dispatched to the crash site. Government of Luxembourg requested additional help from the Belgian government, which deployed three helicopters to the crash site and a military hospital was put on standby.

Incumbent Prime Minister of Luxembourg Jean-Claude Juncker visited the site of the accident on the same day of the crash, accompanied by Luxembourgish Interior Minister Michel Wolter, Transport Minister Henri Grethen and Grand Duchess of Luxembourg Maria Teresa. An emergency meeting was eventually convened by the prime minister to investigate the crash. German Transport Minister Manfred Stolpe visited the country to meet with officials regarding the crash of Flight 9642.

Relatives of the victims were ushered to a special morgue to see the victims. Psychological counseling would be provided by the state for affected family members. State flags were ordered to be lowered at half-mast across the country until 10 November. A ceremonial service was held on 7 November, followed by another service which was held on 10 November on the capital's Notre-Dame cathedral.

Investigation 
Officials could not theorize on the possible causes of the accident during the initial aftermath of the crash. They did note that the flight's destination airport was covered by autumnal fog. Nearby residents of Niederanven stated that the fog at the time of the accident was very thick, so much that nearby residents couldn't realize that a crash had just occurred, even though Niederanven was in close proximity to the crash site.

The maintenance logbook was also clean. The aircraft was inspected by a maintenance crew on the evening before the flight. The only recurring defect was the inoperative anti-skid system, which was rectified a day before the accident.

Lack of preparation 
At 07:53 a.m local time, the crew of the flight established their first contact with the approach controller. While approaching the airport, the crew sought information about the visibility at the airport, to which the controller replied with the available data on the RVR. The crew were worried with the discovery as it was under the minimum amount for Fokker F50 and decided to wait within the holding pattern until the weather began to improve. This crucial information regarding the minimum visibility was not relayed to the controller and caused the controller to consider the crew of being capable to conduct an approach regardless of the RVR value. Meanwhile, the crew thought that it was going to be awhile before they managed to get a landing clearance and therefore no landing preparation was conducted.

While Flight 9642 was approaching the holding pattern, the controller realized that the holding pattern had become nearly full of traffic as there were three other Luxair flights in it. The controller wanted to clear the holding pattern from being jam-packed by asking one of the flights to immediately conduct an approach. Coincidentally, Flight 9642 was the most suitable for such decision as they had not reached the holding pattern yet and by asking the crew to conduct an approach there would be lesser delay for the other aircraft. The controller then instructed the crew to start executing an approach to Findel.

After a bit of confusion and another confirmation from the controller, the unprepared crew were taken aback by the order. They were initially certain that they were going to wait within the holding pattern, but the sudden transmission from the controller effectively cut their remaining time until landing. They quickly checked their checklist and hastily briefed the approach, in which during the course they accidentally missed some of the per procedure actions due to their time constraint.

Feeling uncertain with the approach, Captain Poeckes told First Officer Arendt that they would perform a go-around if the RVR was still below the minima. First Officer Arendt, however, chose to ignore him and continued with the approach checklist, a hint of a possible crew breakdown due to the lack of preparation for the approach. Captain Poeckes eventually called for a go-around, but after an updated RVR report informed him that the weather had met the exact minimum for a landing, he immediately changed his mind and decided to continue the approach.

The sudden decision from the crew to continue the approach pressed the crew to immediately capture the glide slope as the aircraft had been levelling off at 3,000ft and they had overflown the final approach point for the airport, the exact point where pilots should start descending for the final approach. There was no known procedure for the crew to intercept the glideslope after passing the final approach point. The crew should have executed a missed approach, but instead they kept their mind to land in Findel as quickly as possible.

Knowing that they were flying quite high above the glideslope, Captain Poeckes reduced the engine thrust. Eager to quickly capture the glideslope, he decided to improvise, using a skill that he had learned previously.

Reverse range 
To gain the intended speed, Captain Poeckes tried to make the engines to enter the ground range by lifting the ground range selector. By doing so, the airspeed would decrease further and, as per Poeckes's understanding, their aim to get the glideslope quickly would be attained. While this technique could be used by pilots to slow down their aircraft, it was prohibited if they were still in the air. Beyond the ground range was the reverse range, which would change the propeller pitch to reverse. The reverse pitch was usually used while the aircraft was rolling on the runway during landing. Entering this range in the air would produce massive drag forces on the aircraft and would endanger the flight. To prevent an accidental deployment of the reverse range, the aircraft was equipped with a secondary stop, a specific safety feature which was regulated by the flight idle solenoid.

However, said specific feature could be overridden by a design flaw within the flight system of the Fokker F50. Fokker acknowledged that the extension of the landing gear could produce an electromagnetic interference within the aircraft's anti-skid units, causing the aircraft to think that the wheels were spinning, indicating that it was already on the ground, for a period of 30 microseconds. The brief glitch powered up the flight idle solenoids and tricked them into thinking that the aircraft was rolling on the runway, causing them to temporarily open the secondary stop feature for 16 seconds.

In Flight 9642, as the aircraft was about to land, the crew extended the landing gear and configured the aircraft accordingly. The electromagnetic interference occurred and this in turn energized the flight idle solenoids, opening the secondary stop. Captain Poeckes presumably was concerned about the limited time and their current altitude and pulled the lever back even further from the ground range to the reverse range in order to capture the glideslope faster. Normally, the secondary stop would've had prohibited the thrust from entering the reverse range, but as the 16 seconds activation was still in effect, the reverse thrust was engaged.

The activation of the reverse thrust in mid-air caused difficulties in controlling the aircraft. The propeller speed suddenly jumped and produced sound loud enough for the pilots to be startled. The airspeed then dropped and the aircraft quickly lost lift, losing altitude rapidly. The crew attempted to save their aircraft by cutting off the fuel flows to the engines, but the aircraft continued to plunge. In a last attempt, they tried to flare as much as possible to prevent a violent impact. They knew that the reverse thrust had been deployed in mid-air, but couldn't rectify the problem.

Design flaw 
Fokker knew about the possible aircraft-induced reset of the secondary stop as early as 1988. The cause of the glitch was identified during maintenance activities in which the power-up effect of the aircraft's anti-skid system was found to be the culprit. However, due to the low probability of such incidence to occur, Fokker thought that no immediate corrective actions were required. For the reset to occur, these conditions had to be met:
 Landing gear must be lowered
 Anti-skid units must be powered and opened locks of the secondary stop for 16 seconds
 The lever must be below the flight idle position and the crew had to lift the ground range selector (considered to be not normal)
 Within the 16 seconds timeframe, the crew must continue to pull the thrust lever down.

In December 1994, Fokker disseminated the findings to all operators of the aircraft, including Luxair.

The company had attempted to modify their anti-skid units. In 1992, a non-binding service bulletin was issued, telling operators to transport their Fokker F50 fleets for a voluntary modification on their anti-skid units, which would prevent such failure from occurring. Multiple Fokker F50 had been turned in to Fokker to undergo modifications, but the involved Luxair aircraft was not among those sent as it was not mandatory for operators to send their aircraft for an updated design.

Conclusion
In December 2003, Luxembourgish AET published the final report. It concluded the cause of the crash as follow:
 

Contributing to the accident were errors concerning the implementation of a safety recommendation which had been made by the manufacturer to Fokker 50 operators.

The crash significantly affected all Fokker F50 aircraft that were being operated in Luxembourg. Nearly two weeks after the crash, following the discovery of the failure of the secondary stop safety feature to prevent the thrust from entering the reverse range, authorities decided to change the issued service bulletins regarding the anti-skid units from voluntary to mandatory. In May 2003, Dutch authorities announced that the modifications would be made mandatory. Every Fokker 50 in Luxembourg were subjected to compulsory modification on the anti-skid control system and should be changed accordingly after November 2003. AET also recommended Fokker to conduct review on the aircraft's current design as flaw within the aircraft could threaten the safety of flights by overriding the aircraft's safety feature.

Aftermath 

A criminal prosecution was launched but was delayed until 10 October 2011. Captain Poecks, three former Luxair executives, and three mechanics (one of whom was formally a technical director) were all charged with involuntary manslaughter and negligence. The executives were later acquitted. On 27 March 2012, the remaining defendants were all found guilty. Captain Poecks was sentenced to 42 months (3.5 years) of probation and to pay a fine of 4,000 euros. The three mechanics were sentenced to 18 months, two years, and four years of probation respectively, and to pay fines of 2,000 to 2,500 euros. In January 2014, the families of four of the victims received 21,000 to 130,000 euros in compensation. In February the same year, the attorneys of the convicted appealed the court's verdict. In May 2015, a court paid 310,000 euros in compensation to the families of three German victims.

See also
 Air Caraïbes Flight 1501, a similar crash in Guadeloupe in which the pilots accidentally changed the aircraft's propeller switch into reverse pitch while still in mid-air
 Airlines PNG Flight 1600, a similar crash in Papua New Guinea involving a Dash 8 in which the pilots accidentally changed the aircraft's propeller switch into reverse pitch while still in mid-air
 Kish Air Flight 7170, a similar crash in United Arab Emirates in which the pilots accidentally changed the aircraft's propeller switch into reverse pitch while still in mid-air
 Merpati Nusantara Airlines Flight 6517, a similar crash in Indonesia involving a Xian MA60 in which the pilots accidentally changed the aircraft's propeller switch into reverse pitch while still in mid-air
 List of accidents and incidents involving commercial aircraft

References

Further reading
  "Jugement dans l'affaire dite Luxair" [Judgment in the so-called Luxair case] (Archive). Government of Luxembourg. 27 March 2012.

External links

 Administration for Technical Investigations
 Final Report (Archive) – Translation of French report
  Final Report." (Archive) – Original report
 Preliminary Report (Archive, Alternate) – Translation of French Report
  Preliminary Report (Archive, Alternate) – Original report
 "AIRCRAFT ACCIDENT LG9642/LH2420" (Archive). Luxair.
 Government of Luxembourg
  Accident aérien au Luxembourg (6 novembre 2002) (Archive)
  Communiqué Déroulement de l'accident d'un avion Luxair." (Archive) – 6 Nov 2002
  Communiqué du parquet du Luxembourg (2003) (Archive)
 
Cockpit Voice Recorder transcript and accident summary
Pictures of the crash

2002 disasters in Europe
Aviation accidents and incidents in Luxembourg
Airliner accidents and incidents caused by pilot error
Aviation accidents and incidents in 2002
2002 in Luxembourg
Airliner accidents and incidents involving fog
Accidents and incidents involving the Fokker 50
Airliner accidents and incidents involving controlled flight into terrain
November 2002 events in Europe